Brabo

 Bråbo, a hundred (former administrative division) in Sweden.
 Silvius Brabo, a Roman soldier in Belgian legend.
 Brabo Fountain, a fountain at Antwerp named after him.